Dominique Gardette (born 10 June 1954) is a former French female canoeist who won at senior level the Wildwater Canoeing World Championships.

References

External links
 Dominique Gardette at Usawildwater

1954 births
Living people
French female canoeists